The Light Me Up Tour is the first headline tour by the hard rock band The Pretty Reckless. In the summer of 2010 American the band set off on tour in support of their debut studio album, Light Me Up.

Background
The Light Me Up tour kicked off in London, England, at the O2 Academy Islington; following these two performances, the band appeared at the V Festival.

In February 2011, the band toured the United States extensively; then, the band set off on a festival-based European summer tour performing at twelve major international music festivals. Some of these festivals included the Download Festival in England and the Rock am Ring and Rock im Park festivals in Germany.

Throughout August 2011, The Pretty Reckless performed in Tokyo and Osaka as part of the Summer Sonic Festival. The band was scheduled to perform at the Soundwave Revolution from September 24, 2011 – October 3, 2011, before the festival series was cancelled. Some of the artists scheduled to play were invited back to Australia to perform in a replacement mini-festival tour called Counter Revolution. The Pretty Reckless were among those artists that decided to return. But they too eventually pulled out of the festival series.

It was confirmed in October 2011 that The Pretty Reckless would perform at Soundwave in 2012.

On July 26, 2011, Taylor Momsen announced via Twitter that The Pretty Reckless would tour Europe alongside Evanescence and Fair To Midland; eventually, a North American leg was announced with The Pretty Reckless and Rival Sons opening for Evanescence.

On February 9, 2012, The Pretty Reckless announced they would play two SideWaves in Sydney and Melbourne, Australia.

Opening acts
Francesqa (UK 2010)
Runner Runner (US, Spring 2011)
A Thousand Horses (US, Spring 2011 Selected Dates)
Heroes For Hire (Australian SideWaves 2012)

Tour dates

Festivals and other miscellaneous performances

<small>
This concert was a part of "V Festival"
This concert was a private show
This a meet and greet event followed by a private performance
This concert was a part of "Rock am Ring"
This concert was a part of "Rock im Park"
This concert was a part of "Heineken Jammin' Festival"
This concert was a part of "Download Festival"
This concert was a part of "Nova Rock Festival"
This concert was a part of "Main Square Festival"
This concert was a part of "Rock Werchter"
This concert was a part of "Wireless Festival"

<small>
This concert was a part of "Montreux Jazz Festival"
This concert was a part of "Oxegen"
This concert was a part of "T in the Park"
This concert was a part of "Tuborg GreenFest"
This concert was a part of "Lollapalooza"
This concert was a part of "Summer Sonic Festival"
This concert was a part of "Intercity Music Festival"
This concert was a part of "Tulsa State Fair"
The Pretty Reckless were supporting Evanescence at this show
The Pretty Reckless were supporting Guns N' Roses at this show
This concert was a part of "Soundwave Revolution"

Cancellations and rescheduled shows

Box office score data

References

External links

2010 concert tours
2011 concert tours
2012 concert tours